Cogollo del Cengio is a town in the province of Vicenza, Veneto, Italy. It is north of SP 350 provincial road.

Twin towns
Cogollo del Cengio is twinned with:

  Mauthausen, Austria, since 1999

Sources
(Google Maps)

Cities and towns in Veneto